The 2012 United States Senate election in Connecticut was held on November 6, 2012, in conjunction with the 2012 U.S. presidential election, other elections to the United States Senate in other states, as well as elections to the United States House of Representatives, and various state and local elections. Primaries to elect Senate candidates from the Republican and Democratic parties were held on Tuesday, August 14, 2012.

Incumbent U.S. Senator Joe Lieberman, an independent who caucused with the Democratic Party, decided to retire instead of running for re-election to a fifth term. Republican businesswoman Linda McMahon faced Democratic Representative Chris Murphy in the general election and lost, marking two defeats in as many years.

Background 
In the 2006 election, incumbent Joe Lieberman was defeated in the Democratic primary by businessman Ned Lamont and formed his own party, Connecticut for Lieberman, winning re-election. Lieberman promised to remain in the Senate Democratic Caucus, but had since stood against the Democrats on many significant issues, including his endorsement of Republican 2008 presidential nominee John McCain over Barack Obama. As a result, Lieberman's poll numbers among Democrats dropped significantly.

Connecticut Attorney General Richard Blumenthal was reportedly considering a run against Lieberman, but instead ran for and won Connecticut's other Senate seat in 2010 after U.S. Senator Christopher Dodd announced his retirement.

Lieberman had publicly floated the possibility of running as a Democrat, Republican, or an independent. However, on January 19, 2011, he announced that he would not run for another term.

Democratic primary

Candidates

Declared 
 Susan Bysiewicz, former Connecticut Secretary of State
 Chris Murphy, U.S. Representative
 Sylvester Salcedo, attorney
 Lee Whitnum, anti-AIPAC activist and software engineer

Withdrawn 
 Matthew Oakes, activist (endorsed Murphy)
 William Tong, State Representative (running for re-election; endorsed Murphy)

Debates 
The first Democratic debate took place on February 23, 2012, with Murphy, Bysiewicz, and Tong participating. The first televised debate was held on April 5, with Murphy, Bysiewicz, Tong, Oakes, and Whitnum participating. A debate was held at UConn on April 9, with the five candidates participating. A debate sponsored by WFSB took place on April 15, with all five taking part.

Convention 
Delegates of the Connecticut Democratic Party endorsed Chris Murphy at their state party convention held on May 12. Murphy was the choice of 1,378 delegates (76 percent), while Susan Bysiewicz won 444 delegates (24 percent), enough to qualify for the August 14 primary. Matthew Oakes received the support of one delegate from Hartford. Lee Whitnum's name was not placed in nomination.

Endorsements

Polling

Results

Republican primary

Candidates

Declared 
 Brian Hill, attorney
 Peter Lumaj, attorney
 Linda McMahon, businesswoman and nominee for the U.S. Senate in 2010
 Chris Shays, former U.S. Representative
 Kie Westby, attorney

Declined
 John Ratzenberger, actor

Debates 
A debate sponsored by the Norwich Bulletin took place on April 19, 2012, with McMahon, Shays, Lumaj, Hill, and Westby in attendance. The debate was not televised. The first televised debate took place on April 22, 2012, sponsored by WFSB. All five candidates participated.

Convention 
Delegates of the Connecticut Republican Party endorsed Linda McMahon at their state party convention held on May 18. McMahon was the choice of 730 delegates (60 percent), while Chris Shays won 389 delegates (32 percent), enough to qualify for the August 14 primary. Brian K. Hill, Peter Lumaj, and Kie Westby did not meet the 15 percent threshold necessary to automatically qualify for the primary, receiving the support of 62, 22, and 5 delegates, respectively. Hill pursued a post-convention attempt to petition his way onto the primary ballot, but fell short of the 8,319 signatures required and suspended his campaign in June.

Endorsements

Polling

Results

General election

Candidates 
 Linda McMahon (Republican, Independent), businesswoman and nominee for the U.S. Senate in 2010
 Chris Murphy (Democratic, Working Families), U.S. Representative
 Paul Passarelli (Libertarian)

Campaign 
Susan Bysiewicz was the first to declare herself as a candidate. However, by March 2011 Chris Murphy had raised over $1 million, more than Susan Bysiewicz, who had raised $500,000. Murphy had won election to Connecticut's 5th congressional district, which is considered Republican-leaning, and he promoted himself as the most electable candidate against a Republican challenger. Bysiewicz, the former Secretary of the State of Connecticut, enjoyed high name recognition while a statewide officeholder, and had a formidable face-off with Murphy. William Tong, a state representative, joined the race touting his biography as the son of Chinese immigrants working at a Chinese restaurant. In January East Hartford resident Matthew John Oakes announced his candidacy. Oakes pointed to his real life experience being a disabled American, victim of crime, civil rights activist, growing up in the inner-city and being a political outsider for his candidacy.

Wide speculation continued on Linda McMahon, who had a widely publicized race for senator in 2010. She lost the election decisively, but had strong finances and a well-established political organization. McMahon met with her former campaign consultant to review her 2010 results, and said she was leaning towards running. She planned to make a decision regarding another run after the start of 2012. Congressman Chris Shays joined in August 2011, promoting his involvement in Iraq and Afghanistan's military contracting. Shays campaign had also gained traction from a series of independent polls showing him beating or in dead heat with the top Democratic contenders in the general election, while those same polls showed McMahon losing handily to each of the top Democratic contenders. The Shays campaign quickly capitalized on these polls, arguing for the former Congressman's electability while questioning McMahon's electability due to her loss in an open Senate seat contest in 2010 by a large margin despite spending $50 million of her own money, also citing her high unfavorable numbers among state voters, and the weak fundraising numbers of the McMahon campaign.

In July 2012, Shays declared that he would not support McMahon if she won the primary. He said that he had "never run against an opponent that I have respected less—ever—and there are a lot of candidates I have run against," adding that "I do not believe that Linda McMahon has spent the time, the energy to determine what [being] a senator really means." He also said that during the last debate he had with McMahon, "I thought she was embarrassingly clueless" and that "I think she is a terrible candidate and I think she would make a terrible senator." Although he said he would not support Chris Murphy, he expected him to win the Democratic nomination and the general election.

In September 2012, the records of the McMahons' 1976 bankruptcy and specifics of nearly $1 million unpaid debts from the proceeding were published. In days the candidate and her husband announced the "intention to reimburse all private individual creditors that can be located".

Debates 
Complete video of debate, October 7, 2012
Complete video of debate, October 11, 2012
Complete video of debate, October 16, 2012
Complete video of debate, October 18, 2012

Fundraising

Top contributors

Top industries

Predictions

Polling 

With Mark Boughton

With Susan Bysiewicz

With Michael Fedele

With Scott Frantz

With Joe Lieberman

With Chris Shays

With Rob Simmons

With William Tong

Results

Results by congressional district
Murphy won all 5 congressional districts.

See also 
 2012 United States Senate elections
 2012 United States House of Representatives elections in Connecticut

References

External links 
 Connecticut Secretary of State – Elections and Voting
 Campaign contributions at OpenSecrets
 Outside spending at the Sunlight Foundation
 Candidate issue positions at On the Issues

Official campaign websites (Archived)
 Linda McMahon for U.S. Senate
 Chris Murphy for U.S. Senate

2012 Connecticut elections
Connecticut
2012